The 49th Dan Kolov & Nikola Petrov Tournament,  was a sport wrestling event held in  Sofia, Bulgaria between 25 and 27 February 2011.

This international tournament includes competition in both men's and women's freestyle wrestling and men's Greco-Roman wrestling. This tournament is held in honor of Dan Kolov who was the first European freestyle wrestling champion from Bulgaria and  European and World Champion Nikola Petroff.

Medal table

Medal overview

Men's freestyle

Greco-Roman

Women's freestyle

Participating nations

291 competitors from 26 nations participated.
 (2)
 (14)
 (71) 
 (6) 
 (10)
 (2)
 (8)
 (2)
 (8)
 (4)
 (2)
 (3)
 (15)
 (5) 
 (3)
 (13)
 (7)
 (23) 
 (11) 
 (2)
 (3)
 (8)
 (13)
 (31)
 (2)
 (24)

References 

2011 in European sport
2011 in sport wrestling
February 2011 sports events in Europe
2011 in Bulgarian sport